The 2019–20 Super League Greece was the 84th season of the Super League, the top Greek professional league for association football clubs, since its establishment in 1959.

The season marks the first year that the league that included a Play-off Round, whereby the top six teams at the conclusion of the regular season played each other exclusively to determine the league champion. The rest of the teams played each other in a Play-out Round to determine the relegation positions.

The season was suspended on 13 March 2020 due to COVID-19 pandemic in Greece, then later resumed on 5 June 2020.

During the championship, the multi-ownership scandal broke out between PAOK and Xanthi. The ESA (Professional Sports Committee) considered the case serious, which meant the automatic relegation of the two teams. The government brought an extraordinary amendment to the parliament under the pretext of splitting social cohesion. The amendment provided for the deduction of 5 to 10 points from those who violate the law on multi-ownership in Greek football by acquiring shares of other PAE.

Olympiacos won the championship for the 45th time. They also finished undefeated in the 26 games of the regular season of the league and remained undefeated in the first 7 games of the final phase of the playoffs, until he lost the 8th game of the playoffs (0-1 by PAOK). He also achieved a record of best defense in the regular season with just 9 goals conceded.

In the match between Olympiakos - Panathinaikos which ended 3-0 in favor of the home team, Olympiakos striker Youssef El-Arabi scored a rare goal in the history of world football, where it took 66.92 seconds to achieve the goal, 22 passes were exchanged between the Olympiacos players and before the ball reached El Arabi who scored the goal, it passed through the feet of all 11 Olympiacos players who were on the field at the time.

Teams
Fourteen teams will compete in the league – the top twelve teams from the previous season, the previous season's play-off winner and one team promoted from the Football League. The promoted team was Volos. They replaced PAS Giannina, Levadiakos (both teams relegated after eight seasons in the league) and Apollon Smyrnis (relegated after two seasons in the top flight).

Stadiums and locations

Note: Table lists in alphabetical order.

Personnel, kits and TV channel

Managerial changes

Regular season

League table

Results

Positions by round

The table lists the positions of teams after each week of matches. To preserve chronological evolvements, any postponed matches are not included in the round at which they were originally scheduled, but added to the full round they were played immediately afterwards.

Play-off round
The top six teams from Regular season will meet twice (10 matches per team) for places in 2020–21 UEFA Champions League and 2020–21 UEFA Europa League as well as deciding the league champion.

Play-off round positions by round

Play-out round

Play-out round positions by round

Relegation play-offs

|+Summary

|}

Apollon Smyrnis won 4–1 on aggregate and were promoted to 2020–21 Super League. Xanthi were relegated to 2020–21 Super League 2.

Season statistics

Top scorers

Top assists

Players' awards

NIVEA MEN Player of the Month

NIVEA MEN Player of the Club

NIVEA MEN Player of the Regular season

NIVEA MEN Best Goal of the Regular season

NIVEA MEN Best Goal

Annual awards
Annual awards were announced on 16 February 2021.

Team of the Year

Average attendances
Average ticket sales counted officially without games played behind closed doors from Super League.

References

External links
Official website 

Greece
1
A1 Ethniki
A1 Ethniki
2019-20
Association football events postponed due to the COVID-19 pandemic